Men's cricket at the 2014 Asian Games was held in Incheon, South Korea from 27 September to 3 October 2014. Ten men's teams took part in this tournament.

Squads

Results
All times are Korea Standard Time (UTC+09:00)

Group round

Group A

Group B

Knockout round

Quarterfinals

Semifinals

Bronze medal match

Final

Final standing

References

 Results

External links
 Official Website
 Asian Games Men's Competition at ESPNcricinfo

Cricket at the 2014 Asian Games